Ophichthys is a genus of swamp eels native to South Asia. They live in freshwater or subterranean habitats, and some have a fossorial lifestyle.

Taxonomy 
All species in this genus were formerly classified in Monopterus, but a 2020 study found them to represent a distinct monophyletic clade from Monopterus. Due to this, the genus name Ophichthys, previously coined by William John Swainson, was revived to be used for them. Ophichthys was formerly a wastebasket taxon used to lump in many unrelated species of eel-like fish (all of which are classified in separate genera today) and later synonymized with Monopterus until its resurrection.

Species 

 Ophichthys cuchia (F. Hamilton, 1822) (Gangetic swamp eel or Gangetic mud-eel)
 Ophichthys desilvai (R. M. Bailey & Gans, 1998) (lesser swamp eel or Desilvai's blind eel)
 Ophichthys fossorius (K. K. Nayar, 1951) (Malabar swampeel)
Ophichthys hodgarti (B. L. Chaudhuri, 1913) (Indian spaghetti-eel)
 Ophichthys ichthyophoides (Britz, Lalremsanga, Lalrotluanga & Lalramliana, 2011) (scaled swamp eel)
 Ophichthys indicus  (Silas & E. Dawson, 1961) (Bombay swamp eel)

References 

Ophichthys
Freshwater fish genera
Synbranchidae
Taxa named by William John Swainson